Ebrahimzadeh is a surname of Iranian origins. It may refer to:

 Amir Ebrahimzadeh (born 2004), Iranian football forward
 Benjamin Ebrahimzadeh (born 1980), Iranian-German tennis player
 Mahmood Ebrahimzadeh (born 1957), Iranian retired footballer and football coach
 Mansour Ebrahimzadeh (born 1956), Iranian retired football player, and former manager of Sepahan S.C.
 Masoud Ebrahimzadeh (born 1989), Iranian football player
 Mohsen Ebrahimzadeh (born 1987), Iranian pop singer and musician
 Shahin Ebrahimzadeh-Pezeshki (born 1958), Iranian textile artist, researcher, art historian, educator

Surnames of Iranian origin